Wilhelm Leitgebel was a German architect who is celebrated for his designs of three Berlin U-Bahn (or, underground railway) stations. Leitgebel is perhaps best known for his work on the Heidelberger Platz station in Berlin, completed in November 1913. Leitgebel also worked with Alfred Grenander on Nürnberger Platz.

U-Bahn 
 Hohenzollernplatz
 Fehrbelliner Platz
 Heidelberger Platz

References 

20th-century German architects
Year of birth missing
Year of death missing